Trachyscelis is a genus of darkling beetles in the family Tenebrionidae. There are at least two described species in Trachyscelis.

Species
These two species belong to the genus Trachyscelis:
 Trachyscelis aphodioides Latreille, 1809 g b
 Trachyscelis chinensis Champion, 1894 g
Data sources: i = ITIS, c = Catalogue of Life, g = GBIF, b = Bugguide.net

References

Further reading

External links

 

Tenebrionidae